A flywheel is a rotating disk used as a storage device for kinetic energy.

Flywheel may also refer to: 
 Flywheel training
 Flywheel (band), formerly known as Pound
 Flywheel (film), a 2003 Christian drama film by Sherwood Pictures
 Flywheel, Shyster, and Flywheel (1932–33) radio show with Groucho and Chico Marx
 Flywheel, Shyster, and Flywheel (1990 radio series) (1990–92) a BBC Radio 4 adaptation of the series
 Flywheel Arts Collective, Easthampton, Massachusetts, U.S.
 An energy storage device that includes a flywheel; see flywheel energy storage 
 Flywheels, a 1987 Transformers Decepticon character